Oleh Ihorovych Makhnitskyi (Ukrainian: Олег Ігорович Махніцький) is a Ukrainian politician and lawyer. MP of Ukraine 7th Convocation, as a member of "Svoboda".

Ukraine Parliamentary Commissioner for the supervision of the General Prosecutor of Ukraine from 22 February 2014.

From 24 February 2014 — Acting Prosecutor General. The same day Oleh Makhnitsky left Svoboda. President Petro Poroshenko dismissed Makhnitskyi on 18 June 2014 following his own request to resign.

Suspicion in corruption
In July 2014 an internet newspaper nedelya-ua.com published an article of unknown author with allegation of the Makhnitsky's real estate possessions in London that worth around €8.5 million.

References

External links
Prosecutor General's Office of Ukraine

1970 births
Living people
Politicians from Lviv
University of Lviv alumni
Lawyers from Lviv
General Prosecutors of Ukraine
Svoboda (political party) politicians
Ukrainian nationalists
Seventh convocation members of the Verkhovna Rada
Pro-Ukrainian people of the 2014 pro-Russian unrest in Ukraine